957 Camelia  is a large, carbonaceous background asteroid and slow rotator, approximately  in diameter. The C-type asteroid (Cb) has a long rotation period of at least 150 hours. It was named after the genus of flowering plants, Camellia.

Orbit and classification 

Camelia is a non-family asteroid of the main belt's background population when applying the hierarchical clustering method to its proper orbital elements. It orbits the Sun in the outer asteroid belt at a distance of 2.7–3.2 AU once every 5 years (1,826 days; semi-major axis of 2.92 AU). Its orbit has an eccentricity of 0.08 and an inclination of 15° with respect to the ecliptic. The body's observation arc begins at Heidelberg Observatory on 4 October 1926, five years after its official discovery observation.

Naming 

This minor planet was named after the genus of Asian shrubs and trees, Petunia. This genus of flowering plants belongs to the Theaceae (tea family). The prominent ornamental greenhouse shrubs show glossy evergreen leaves and roselike flowers. The  was mentioned in The Names of the Minor Planets by Paul Herget in 1955. Only a minority of minor planets are named after plants.

Reinmuth's flowers 

Due to his many discoveries, Karl Reinmuth submitted a large list of 66 newly named asteroids in the early 1930s. This list also contained a sequence of 28 asteroids, starting with this asteroid, that were all named after plants, in particular flowering plants (also see list of minor planets named after animals and plants).

Physical characteristics 

In the Tholen-like taxonomy of the Small Solar System Objects Spectroscopic Survey (S3OS2), Camelia is a carbonaceous C-type asteroid, while in the SMASS-like taxonomy of the S3OS2, it is a Cb-subtype that transitions from the C-type to the "brighter" B-type asteroids.

Rotation period 

In August 2000, a rotational lightcurve of Camelia was obtained from photometric observations by Brian Warner at the Palmer Divide Observatory  in Colorado. The originally published lightcurve analysis gave a wrong rotation period of  hours with a brightness variation of  magnitude. With such a long period, Camelia is a slow rotator. While the slowest rotators have periods above 1000 hours, the vast majority of asteroids have a much shorter rotation period of 2.2 to 20 hours.

Diameter and albedo 

The Collaborative Asteroid Lightcurve Link derives an albedo of 0.0357 and a diameter of 73.63 km based on an absolute magnitude of 10.71.

Notes

References

External links 
 Lightcurve Database Query (LCDB), at www.minorplanet.info
 Dictionary of Minor Planet Names, Google books
 Discovery Circumstances: Numbered Minor Planets (1)-(5000) – Minor Planet Center
 
 

000957
Discoveries by Karl Wilhelm Reinmuth
Named minor planets
000957
19210907